James Carroll Patrick McNulty (16 August 1918 – 2 April 2011) was a Liberal party member of the House of Commons of Canada. He was an administrator and teacher by career.

The son of Joseph and Monica (née MacDonald) McNulty, he attended
the University of Toronto, McMaster University, the Hamilton College of Education and the Ottawa College of Education. He was a schoolteacher in St. Catharines. In 1944, he married Helen Margaret Kelly.

McNulty served on the council for Grantham Township from 1957 to 1958, on the council for Lincoln County in 1959, as deputy reeve for Grantham township in 1959 and on the city council for St. Catharines from 1960 to 1962.

He was first elected at the Lincoln riding in the 1962 general election and was re-elected there in 1963 and 1965. In the 1968 federal election, he was re-elected at the newly configured St. Catharines riding. After completing his final House of Commons term, the 28th Canadian Parliament, McNulty was defeated at St. Catharines in the 1972 election by J. Trevor Morgan of the Progressive Conservative party.

From 1968 to 1970, he was Parliamentary Secretary to Bryce Mackasey, then the Minister of Labour.

Death
McNulty died from cancer at the age of 92.

References

External links

1918 births
2011 deaths
Canadian schoolteachers
Canadian people of Irish descent
Members of the House of Commons of Canada from Ontario
Liberal Party of Canada MPs
University of Toronto alumni
Politicians from Belleville, Ontario
Deaths from cancer in Ontario